Brent Allan Jones (born July 14, 1963) is an American lawyer, business owner and politician. He served one term as a Republican member of the Nevada Assembly.

Early life
Brent A. Jones was born in 1963 in Ojai, California. He played Little League Baseball as a child and Varsity Football in high school.

Jones attended the University of California, Riverside, and he transferred to Embry–Riddle Aeronautical University, where he was accepted into the Reserve Officers' Training Corps. He dropped out after he contracted Guillain–Barré syndrome, an autoimmune disease. Eventually, he graduated from California State University, Northridge, where he received a Bachelor of Science in business administration. He received a juris doctor from the Pepperdine University School of Law. He passed the California Bar exam.

Career
Jones started his career as a lawyer. According to his campaign website, he "did the preliminary legal work and assisted in raising start-up capital for Light Point Systems," a private company which "provides solar technology for hand held electronics" out of Ventura, California.

Jones serves as the chief executive officer of Affinity Lifestyles, a private company which makes Real Water, a brand of bottled water in Nevada. The water comes from the Las Vegas Valley Water District; it is reverse osmosis water plus an alkalizing agent in a bottle. The company has 40-60 employees. The company's Real Water product, which advertises an alkaline pH, became central to lawsuits and an FDA probe related to several cases of hepatitis and liver failure. In response Jones posted a video on the company's website expressing his "deepest sympathy and concern", and the company recalled all products.

Jones served as a Republican member of the Nevada Assembly from 2014 until 2016, where he represented District 35, including Enterprise, Nevada. He is opposed to raising taxes.

Jones was defeated in his bid for reelection by Democrat Justin Watkins.

Personal life
With his wife Aimee, they have three children. They reside in Las Vegas, Nevada.

Jones is a Scientologist.

References

Living people
1963 births
People from Ojai, California
Politicians from Las Vegas
California State University, Northridge alumni
Pepperdine University School of Law alumni
California lawyers
Businesspeople from Las Vegas
Republican Party members of the Nevada Assembly
21st-century American politicians
American Scientologists